Health and Physical Education Building may refer to:

Health and Physical Education Building (LSUS), the name of a sports facility at Louisiana State University Shreveport
Health and Physical Education Building (SUNO), the name of a sports facility at Southern University at New Orleans